Snakeden Hollow State Fish and Wildlife Area is an Illinois state park on  in Knox County, Illinois, United States. Snakeden Hollow contains 125 water impoundments totaling . The water areas currently contain largemouth and smallmouth bass, rainbow and brown trout, muskie, bluegill, redear sunfish, walleye, green sunfish, black crappie, channel catfish and bullhead. Good wildlife habitat provides a home to numerous species of mammals, birds and reptiles. A favorite nesting spot of giant Canada geese, the site has  of grassland, brushy draws, briers, shrubs, cropland and limited hardwood forest. The remaining  are in agricultural leases.

References

State parks of Illinois
Protected areas of Knox County, Illinois
Protected areas established in 1987
1987 establishments in Illinois